This is a list of the gymnasts who represented their country at the 1992 Summer Olympics in Barcelona from 25 July to 9 August 1992. Gymnasts across two disciplines (artistic gymnastics and rhythmic gymnastics) participated in the Games.

Female artistic gymnasts 

* North Korea was accused of falsifying Kim Gwang-suk's age, and her true year of birth has never been conclusively determined.

Male artistic gymnasts

Rhythmic gymnasts

References 

Lists of gymnasts
Gymnastics at the 1992 Summer Olympics